Chauncy is both a given name and a surname. Notable people with the name include:

Given name
Chauncy Harris (1914–2003), American geographer 
Chauncy Maples (1852–95), British missionary and bishop of Nyasaland
Chauncy Master (born 1985), Malawian runner
Chauncy Batho Dashwood Strettell (1881–1958), English Indian Army officer
Chauncy Townsend (1708–1770), British politician and businessman
Chauncy Hare Townshend (1798–1868), English poet, clergyman, and collector
Chauncy Welliver (born 1983), American-New Zealand boxer

Surname
Charles Chauncy (1592–1671), Anglo-American clergyman and educator
Charles Chauncy (1705–1787), American Congregational clergyman
Henry Chauncy (1632–1719), English lawyer, educator and antiquarian
Ichabod Chauncy (1635–1691), English physician and nonconformist divine
Isaac Chauncy (1632–1712), English dissenting minister
Maurice Chauncy (1509–1581), English Catholic priest and Carthusian monk
Nan Chauncy (1900–1970), British-born Australian novelist
Philip Chauncy (1816–1880), colonial Australian surveyor, amateur ethnographer 
Robert de Chauncy (died 1278), English bishop of Carlisle
William Snell Chauncy (1820–1878), English civil engineer

See also
 Chauncy (disambiguation)
 Chauncey (disambiguation)
 Chauncey (name)